Odunayo Eweniyi is a Nigerian business executive and activist. She is the Co-founder and Chief Operations Officer PiggyVest and co founder of Feminist Coalition.

Background 
Eweniyi is the first child of two professors that take up origins from Oyo State, Nigeria.

Education and career 
Eweniyi graduated from Covenant University in 2013 with a first-class degree in Computer Engineering. Eweniyi started out to launch Push CV with Somto Ifezue and Joshua Chibueze after her graduation in 2013. Two years later, the trio went on to start PiggyVest in 2016.

Awards 
In 2018, Eweniyi won the Future Awards Africa Prize in Technology. In 2019, she was on Forbes Africa 30 under 30 Technology list. Eweniyi was named as one of 30 Quartz Africa Innovators for 2019.

Eweniyi was on Forbes Africa's list of 20 New Wealth Creators in Africa 2019. She was nominated for The Future Awards Africa Prize for Young Person of The Year in 2020. Eweniyi was also listed on Bloomberg 50 in 2020 and Time' Next 100 list in 2021 for her joint contributions during the End SARS protests of October 2020. In March 2022, she won the Forbes Woman Africa Technology and Innovation Award.

Activism and ENDSARS 
During the End SARS protests in 2020 against Nigerian police brutality, Eweniyi raised donations for medical care and legal support for victims of police brutality during and after the protests.

In January 2021, Eweniyi partnered with Eloho Oname to launch First Check, a platform of female business angels focused on supporting women led and women focused startups in Africa.

References 

Nigerian technology businesspeople
Nigerian women business executives
Covenant University alumni
Year of birth missing (living people)
Living people